Francis Repin Makaya Tschitenbo (born 12 August 1975) is a Congolese former footballer who played as a midfielder. He represented the Congo national football team at the 2000 African Cup of Nations.

References

1975 births
Living people
Republic of the Congo footballers
Association football midfielders
FC Erzgebirge Aue players
VfL Herzlake players
VfR Aalen players
1. FC Schweinfurt 05 players
Bahlinger SC players
Regionalliga players
2000 African Cup of Nations players
Republic of the Congo international footballers
Republic of the Congo expatriate footballers
Expatriate footballers in Germany
Republic of the Congo expatriate sportspeople in Germany